Kal Tire is a wholly owned Canadian company based in Vernon, British Columbia, where it was founded in 1953 by Thomas J. Foord  and Jim Lochhead.  Its business comprises retail tire sales for passenger and light truck vehicles, mechanical services for passenger and light trucks, commercial truck tires, mining and off-road sales and service and retreading of both commercial and off-road tires.

History
Kal Tire was started in 1953 by Thomas J. Foord and Jim Lochhead with the goal of servicing the commercial logging operations that operated in the Okanagan Valley around Vernon, British Columbia and Nakusp, British Columbia by building customers' trust.

Kal Tire was named after Kalamalka Lake, the prominent "Lake of Many Colours" landmark in Vernon. The company is still based in its birthplace of Vernon.

Since 1953, Kal Tire has expanded steadily.  Kal Tire comprises 165 company-owned branches, 49 independent associate dealers, 11 mining/industrial/commercial locations, 10 retread facilities, one OTR plant and four distribution warehouses.  The business covers a market that includes British Columbia, Alberta, Yukon, Northwest Territories, Saskatchewan, Manitoba, Northern Ontario, parts of Southern Ontario and Quebec, as well as mining operations in Mexico, Panama, Colombia, Chile, the United Kingdom, Ghana, Mozambique, Sierra Leone, South Africa, Tanzania, Zambia, Burkina Faso, and Australia.

Marketing

Kal Tire started with the motto of 'If we sell it, we guarantee it', which is still used by the company today.  That was followed by the slogan of 'You'll like us for more than our tires'.  This campaign proved very successful for the company but was then replaced by service stories.  Kal Tire uses the brand position of 'True Service'.

Participation in industry trade shows and participation in organizations is a key part of the marketing strategy of Kal Tire.  Some of the organizations that Kal Tire is associated with include Western Canada Tire Dealers Association, Tire Industry Association and BC Roadbuilders Association.

Services

Retail
Kal Tire sells and services many name brand manufacturers including: Bridgestone, Firestone, Michelin, BFGoodrich Yokohama, Nokian, Nitto and Multi-Mile products. Kal Tire has expanded its service offering to include  mechanical work ranging from shocks and struts to brakes and oil service, but it is not provided at all locations.  Mechanical part suppliers include Raybestos friction parts, Truxxx lift and levelling kits, Moog steering parts, Trico wiper blades and Pennzoil lubrication products.  Batteries are sold for cars, trucks and marine vehicles using the DieHard line of batteries.

Commercial and industrial
Kal Tire carries a full range of commercial truck tires and is also the largest retreader of commercial tires in Canada. It has ten retread facilities across Canada that use the Bandag process.  Kal Tire also carries and services industrial-use tires for equipment such as forklifts, excavators and tracked vehicles.

OTR and mining
Off-the-road (OTR) tires are generally larger, for use on heavy equipment that would not normally operate on paved roads.  On July 31, 2012, Kal Tire partnered with OTR Tyres in the UK to create a global earthmover tire sales and service company.

References

External links
Kal Tire official website
Commitment to Safety - Work Safe BC
OTR Tyres Official Website
Western Canada Tire Dealers Association
Tire Industry Association
BC Roadbuilders Association

Retail companies established in 1953
Automotive companies of Canada
Automotive repair shops
Canadian brands
Companies based in Vernon, British Columbia